The Central District of Sarab County is in East Azerbaijan province, Iran. At the National Census in 2006, its population was 101,342 in 24,862 households. The following census in 2011 counted 101,446 people in 28,832 households. At the latest census in 2016, the district had 97,096 inhabitants in 29,735 households.

References 

Sarab County

Districts of East Azerbaijan Province

Populated places in East Azerbaijan Province

Populated places in Sarab County